Vålerenga Fotball is a Norwegian association football club from Oslo. They play their home games at Ullevaal Stadion which has a capacity of 28,972. During the 2017 campaign they competed in Eliteserien and the Norwegian Cup.

Season events
On 1 January, Ronny Deila took over as manager from Kjetil Rekdal having signed a contract with the club on 13 July 2016.

Squad

Out on loan

Transfers

Winter

In:

Out:

Summer

In:

Out:

Competitions

Eliteserien

Results summary

Results by round

Results

Table

Norwegian Cup

Squad statistics

Appearances and goals

|-
|colspan="14"|Players away from Vålerenga on loan:

|-
|colspan="14"|Players who left Vålerenga during the season:

|}

Goal scorers

Disciplinary record

References

External links
 Official pages
 Vålerenga Fotball På Nett – the biggest site for unofficial news and views
 Klanen, official Vålerenga supporters club
 Jarles VIF Stats

Vålerenga Fotball seasons
Valerenga